Altamira Airport  is an airport serving the Agrícola Miramontes farming complex in the Boaco Department of Nicaragua.

See also

 List of airports in Nicaragua
 Transport in Nicaragua

References

External links
 HERE Maps - Altamira Airport
 OurAirports - Altamira Airport
 FallingRain - Altamira Airport

Airports in Nicaragua